Fred E. Davis Jr. is a former member of the New Hampshire House of Representatives.

Education
Davis earned a high school diploma from Biddeford High School.

Career
Davis served in the United States Marine Corps. Davis is a retired truck driver. Davis served as moderator for the 4th Ward of Nashua. On November 6, 2018, Davis was elected to the New Hampshire House of Representatives where he represents the Hillsborough 31 district. He assumed office on December 5, 2018. He is a Democrat. On September 8, 2020, Davis was defeated for re-election in the primary.

Personal life
Davis resides in Nashua, New Hampshire. Davis is divorced and has one child.

References

Living people
Politicians from Nashua, New Hampshire
Democratic Party members of the New Hampshire House of Representatives
United States Marines
21st-century American politicians
Year of birth missing (living people)
Biddeford High School alumni